The Milford Parkway, officially the Daniel S. Wasson Connector, is a  parkway between U.S. Route 1 and the Merritt and Wilbur Cross Parkways (Route 15) in Milford, New Haven County, Connecticut. The highway is officially designated by the Connecticut Department of Transportation as State Road 796 (SR 796) but is not signed as such. As a designated scenic road, commercial vehicles are prohibited from using the Milford Parkway.

In 2012, the Milford Parkway had an average daily traffic count of 58,800 vehicles in the northbound direction.

Route description
The Milford Parkway has one intermediate exit between US 1 and Route 15, at Interstate 95. There is also a partial interchange to Wheelers Farms Road by way of Wellington Road, which is also served by exit 55A on the Wilbur Cross Parkway (Route 15).

On ConnDOT highway maps, the route is referred to as the "Daniel S. Wasson Milford Police Department Connector."

History
At its completion on September 2, 1940, the Merritt Parkway ended at the present-day Sikorsky Bridge crossing over the Housatonic River, and the Wilbur Cross Parkway was planned to continue in the northeast direction towards Hartford. The Milford Parkway was then built as a connection between the two parkways and U.S. Route 1 (US 1). The Milford Parkway was opened to traffic on September 2, 1942.

The long loop ramp connecting to southbound Route 15, including the interchange with Wheelers Farms Road, was completed in 1993. Until this point, there was no access to the Milford Parkway from southbound Wilbur Cross Parkway.

On June 23, 2003, the parkway was renamed to honor of Daniel S. Wasson, the first police officer to die in the line of duty in the city of Milford. Wasson was killed on April 12, 1987, when he was shot by a motorist he had pulled over.

Prior to 2012, the parkway was treated mostly as a ramp, signed as "To I-95 / US 1" on Route 15 and Wheelers Farms Road, as well as "To Route 15" on both I-95 and US 1. In summer 2012, exit numbers were applied to the parkway's four interchanges. Also included in the project were the first signs to designate the parkway by the Milford Parkway name, located on US 1. However, entrance signs at the other three interchanges still do not list the name of the road.

Exit list

References

Milford, Connecticut
Transportation in New Haven County, Connecticut
M
Freeways in the United States
Parkways in the United States